East Shore may refer to:

East Shore, California, an unincorporated community in Plumas County
East Shore (New Haven), a neighborhood of the city of New Haven, Connecticut
East Shore, Staten Island, a region in the New York City borough of Staten Island